An extremotroph (from Latin  meaning "extreme" and Greek  meaning "food") is an organism that feeds on matter that is not typically considered to be food to most life on Earth. "These anthropocentric definitions that we make of extremophily and extremotrophy focus on a single environmental extreme but many extremophiles may fall into multiple categories, for example, organisms living inside hot rocks deep under the Earth's surface."

Examples 
Pestalotiopsis microspora: plastic eater
Halomonas titanicae: metal eater 
Geotrichum candidum: compact disk eater 
Aspergillus fumigatus: printed circuit board eater 
Deinococcus radiodurans: radioactive waste eater
Actinobacteria from arid and desert habitats 
Cold-tolerant cyanobacteria found in polar ice shelves

Industrial uses 
Extremotrophs are used as bioremediation and biodegradation agents.

See also

Chemotroph
Extremophile
Heterotroph
Lithoautotroph

References

Eating behaviors